Adbolton is a village in the English county of Nottinghamshire on the south bank of the River Trent one mile west of Holme Pierrepont.

Adbolton was listed in the Domesday book of 1086.

References

External links 
 

Villages in Nottinghamshire
Rushcliffe